The R28 was a New York City Subway car model built by American Car and Foundry (ACF) from 1960 to 1961. The cars were a "follow-up" or supplemental stock for the A Division's R26s and closely resemble them. The average car cost per R28 was $114,495. A total of 100 cars were built, arranged in married pairs.

The R28s entered service in late-1960 and received air conditioning by 1982. The fleet was rebuilt by Morrison–Knudsen between 1985 and 1987. The R28s were replaced in 2001 & 2002 with the delivery of the R142 and R142A cars with the last train running on October 7, 2002. After being retired, most R28s were sunk into the ocean as artificial reefs, but four cars have survived.

Description
The R28s were numbered 7860–7959. They were the second order of cars to not be built with operating cabs at both ends after the R26s. They were also the last passenger cars built by ACF, with the closure of the Berwick assembly plant following the delivery of the final cars delivered in January 1961. ACF has since focused solely on freight rolling stock.

Like the R26s the even-numbered car carried the motor generator and battery set for electrical equipment, while the odd numbered car held air compressor for the brakes. A special version of the H2C coupler was used to link the cars, so they could easily be split if needed, and thus, they were called "semi-permanent pairs". Only the No.1 end had the operator controls. The No.2 end had conductor's controls only. Although referred to as the "blind end", these ends did have windows for the conductor.

The R28s wore several paint schemes during their service lives. The cars were delivered in the dark olive green color paint scheme similar to the R21s, R22s, and R26s. In 1970–1975 the R28s were repainted into the MTA corporate silver and blue scheme. In 1982–1983 the R28s were repainted full white (roof, bonnets, sides were all painted white) in attempt to combat graffiti. During rebuilding by Morrison–Knudsen at Hornell, New York from 1985 to 1987 the R28s were repainted into Redbirds with a deep maroon red body, black front bonnets and anti-climbers, and a silver roof.

History

Early history
The first set of R28s was delivered in mid-1960 and placed into service on the  train in late-1960. By January 1961 all cars have been delivered.

Late 1970s–Late 1980s

Rebuilding
By 1982, all cars in this series had received air conditioning as part of a retrofitting program to replace the cars' original Axiflow ceiling fans.

Rebuilt by Morrison–Knudsen in Hornell, New York between 1985 and 1987, the R28s were repainted as Redbirds and were the first cars to be repainted in the scheme. All Westinghouse cars were refitted with GE equipment.

Before they were rebuilt, the R28 cars were grouped as follows:
 Cars 7860–7909 had Westinghouse electrical equipment
 Cars 7910–7959 had General Electric electrical equipment

Beginning in September 1985, the first unrebuilt GE R28s were removed from service to be sent out for rebuilding. By the end of July 1986, the last unrebuilt GE R28s were removed from  service. By October 22, 1987, all rebuilt cars were in service.

The R28s retained their original H2C couplers on both ends until 1991, when the new Scheduled Maintenance System (SMS) program began. During this time, the R28s were mated numerically and the original H2C couplers on the ends with conductor's controls were replaced with link bars. Prior to 1991, the R28s were often not numerically paired and could also be paired to R26s.

Retirement
As time wore on, heavy service took their toll on these cars. In 1996, the New York City Transit Authority announced their plans to phase out the Redbirds with the R142 and R142A fleets which replaced the entire R28 fleet.
 

After retirement, all but two pairs were stripped to help create the Redbird Reef. The two pairs that were not scrapped are preserved:
 Cars 7924–7925 are still on the New York City Subway property; this pair was previously used for work service at the Unionport Yard until July 2013, when they were moved to the Concourse Yard for storage, along with R26s 7774–7775 and R29s 8678–8679. 
 Cars 7926–7927 are preserved by the Illinois Railway Museum. They were modified with trolley poles and are sometimes operated on the museum's electrified mainline.

References

Train-related introductions in 1960
R028
1960 in rail transport
American Car and Foundry Company